The 2014 season of the Indian Premier League, abbreviated as IPL 7 or Pepsi IPL 2014, was the seventh season of the IPL, a professional Twenty20 cricket league established by the Board of Control for Cricket in India (BCCI) in 2007. The tournament featured eight teams, one fewer than in 2013 after the withdrawal of the Pune Warriors India, and was held from 16 April 2014 to 1 June 2014. The opening ceremony was held in the UAE on 15 April 2014.   Kolkata Knight Riders won the tournament, defeating Kings XI Punjab by 3 wickets with Manish Pandey declared the man of the match in the final. The average attendance for the tournament was 31,751. The tagline was Bulawa aaya hai (invitation has arrived).

A part of tournament was held outside India as Indian Home Minister Sushil Kumar Shinde declined to provide security for the league as the tournament took place at the same time as the 2014 Indian general election. As a result, the tournament was jointly hosted by India and the United Arab Emirates. The opening 20 matches were held in the UAE at three different stadiums in Abu Dhabi, Dubai and Sharjah with the tournament returning to India on 2 May.

The player auction took place on 12 and 13 February 2014. Unlike previous seasons, the auction was in Indian Rupees as opposed to US dollars.

Background

Hosting
On 14 February, BCCI secretary Sanjay Patel told the media after the IPL governing council meeting: "As far as possible our interest is to hold the IPL in India. Then, probably, South Africa is the preferred venue at the moment." The initial part of the season was held outside India, to avoid adding to the existing security demands for the 2014 Lok Sabha Elections. South Africa, Bangladesh and UAE were initially shortlisted as alternative venues. The BCCI working committee's meeting on 28 February decided that a final decision would be taken once the schedule for the general election was announced as the BCCI wanted to have as many matches as possible hosted in India due to pressure from the sponsors.

On 2 March 2014, it was reported that Sri Lanka, which was under fourth consideration for hosting the matches, had been ruled out due to prospect of rains in the country during the period. On 5 March 2014, when the dates for general elections were announced, IPL chairman Ranjib Biswal stated that 60–70 percent of the tournament would be held in India. Also, South Africa as an alternate venue was effectively ruled out since they wanted to host the entire tournament, leaving chances open for UAE and Bangladesh.

On 12 March 2014, it was announced that the tournament would begin on 16 April and at least 16 matches would be played in United Arab Emirates until 30 April. From 1 to 12 May, BCCI  approached the Ministry of Home Affairs, Government of India seeking permission to play IPL matches in India in cities where the polling concluded in the respective state. All matches after 12 May, which is last day of polling for the elections, would be played in India. No matches would be played on 16 May, the day for counting of votes for the general election. The final was played on 1 June 2014.

Schedule 
The schedule of the first phase of the IPL 2014 was announced on 19 March 2014. The first phase of the tournament consisted of 20 matches played from 16 to 30 April 2014 in the United Arab Emirates. The opening match of the tournament was played between the defending champions Mumbai Indians and the Kolkata Knight Riders on 16 April 2014 at the Sheikh Zayed Cricket Stadium in Abu Dhabi at 6:30 pm local time (8:00 pm IST). From 2 May onwards the 36 games of the regular season and the 4 playoffs were played in India across 10 venues.

Staff changes
Gary Kirsten signed up as Head Coach of Delhi Daredevils. Kolkata Knight Riders appointed Woorkeri Raman as batting coach while Wasim Akram returned as bowling coach after taking break for IPL-6. Royal Challengers Bangalore announced Daniel Vettori (member of RCB squad, 2011–13) as head coach and Allan Donald (Head coach of the former Pune Warriors India in the last IPL) as bowling coach, while Trent Woodhill (former batting and fielding coach of Delhi Daredevils) was appointed as batting and fielding coach. Darren Lehmann was not able to continue with Kings XI Punjab due to his commitments with Australian cricket team. Sanjay Bangar was appointed as Kings XI's assistant coach. As former Indian cricket team captain Rahul Dravid decided to quit playing IPL after IPL 2013, Rajasthan Royals team management decided to appoint him as the Chief Team Mentor of the Rajasthan Royals team.

Insurance
Since this year's IPL was played during the Lok Sabha Elections in the country, re-insurance companies asked to double the rates for insurance cover of IPL 7. The insurance cover includes parties like BCCI, franchisees and media partners. The insurance companies expected a high security danger threat during the elections period in the country. The companies demanded Rs. 140 million for a cover of Rs. 9 billion this year which is exactly double the previous year price of Rs. 70 million.

Broadcasting
Times Internet decided to share IPL digital rights with STAR India giving StarSports.com streaming rights alongside YouTube, which had been streaming IPL since its inception in 2008. In the UK, ITV4 showed the league for the final time before Sky Sports took over in 2015. Willow Cricket carried coverage of the season in the United States.

Player auction

On 24 December 2013, the IPL Governing Council finalised the Player Regulations for the 2014 season. All teams were allowed to retain a maximum of five players (at most four Indian capped players) and the rest of the players had to be sent into the auction pool. Retention of players led to reduction of the teams' salary cap by a fixed amount, regardless of the players' actual salaries. Some franchises were unhappy with new retention rules. Each team had a starting salary cap of  600 million ( 60 crore). Three franchises retained the maximum of 5 players while Delhi Daredevils retained none.

This season's auction saw the introduction of several new rules. For the first time Indian uncapped players were also into the auction. There is no minimum quota for catchment area players restriction. All player fees was denominated in Indian rupees but overseas players may choose to be paid in another currency. There was also introduction of the "rights to match", which allowed teams to purchase a player from their 2013 squad in the auction by matching the highest bid. The number of "rights to match" depends on the number of players retained by the team. Also, the players' salaries will not include their fees for participation in the Champions League Twenty20. Teams who qualify will pay each player who represents them an additional 10% of his IPL fee. Previously, players who qualified for the CLT20 with their IPL team had to forfeit 20% of their IPL salary to represent another team.

On 27 January 2014 BCCI released a list of capped players to all the franchises which would be available for the auction. This list had a total of 233 players from 10 countries. On 29 January 2014 this list was updated to 244 capped players and 651 uncapped players. On 6 February 2014, the final auction list was shortlisted by teams to 514 players (219 capped and 295 uncapped). The list was further shortened to 511 players (216 capped and 295 uncapped) after the withdrawal of 3 players. The highest base price set was of Rs 20 million and the lowest of Rs 1 million. The auction took place on 12 and 13 February.

On 7 February 2014, a plea was filed in the Supreme Court to interfere in the IPL auction in relation to the 2013 Indian Premier League spot-fixing and betting case involving Gurunath Meiyappan of Chennai Super Kings. On 10 February 2014, an IPL spot-fixing report finding Meiyappan involved in betting was submitted to the Supreme Court. However the Supreme Court allowed the auction to go ahead as planned.

A total of 154 players including 50 overseas players were sold. The list consisted of 80 capped players (of which 34 were Indians) and 74 uncapped players. 127 players (including 10 who have only been part of the squad) have previously been part of IPL teams. 66 players will represent the same side that they played for in 2013. 13 Right to Match cards were used during the auction. Kevin Pietersen was the costliest foreign player. Many prominent Indian players and most Sri Lankan and English players were unsold like Luke Wright & Alex Hales.

Squads

Venues
The first part of the tournament was hosted in the United Arab Emirates so that the competition would not clash with the Indian elections, with the second part hosted in India. The MA Chidambaram Stadium in Chennai was removed as a venue due to a dispute with the municipal authorities. The home ground of the Rajasthan Royals for the season was also changed from the Sawai Mansingh Stadium in Jaipur to the Sardar Patel Stadium in Ahmedabad as the Rajasthan Cricket Association, the owners of the Sawai Mansingh Stadium, were suspended by the BCCI due to the election of Lalit Modi as its chairman.

Teams and standings

League table

League progression

Group stage

Fixtures

Playoff stage

Preliminary

Final

Statistics

Most runs

The player with the most runs at the end of the tournament received the Orange Cap.
Source: Cricinfo

Most wickets

The player with the most wickets at the end of the tournament received the Purple Cap.
Source: Cricinfo

References

External links
 Official website
 Tournament website on ESPN Cricinfo
 Series page on Wisden India

 
Indian Premier League seasons
Indian Premier League
2014 in Indian cricket
2014 in Emirati sport